C. kraussii may refer to:
 Clionella kraussii, a sea snail species found in South Africa
 Combretum kraussii, the forest bushwillow, a tree species found in South Africa, Eswatini and Mozambique